Atmakur is a village and mandal in Hanamkonda district from the state of Telangana in India.

 List of villages in Atmakur mandal:
1. Agrampahad 
2. Atmakur 
3. Brahamanpalle 
4. Choudla Palle 
5. Damera 
6. House Buzurg 
7. Kamaram 
8. Katakshapur 
9. Kothagattu 
10. Malakpet 
11. Neerukulla 
12. Peddapur 
13. Penchikalpet.

References 

Villages in Hanamkonda district
Mandals in Hanamkonda district